According to the Hebrew Bible, the Kenites ( or ;  Qēinī) were a tribe in the ancient Levant.  They played an important role in the history of ancient Israel. One of the most recognized Kenites is Jethro, Moses' father-in-law, who was a shepherd and a priest in the land of Midian.  says that Moses had a father-in-law who was a Kenite, but it is not clear from the passage if this refers to Jethro. Certain groups of Kenites settled among the Israelite population, including the descendants of Moses' brother-in-law, although the Kenites descended from Rechab maintained a distinct, nomadic lifestyle for some time.

Kenites in pre-WWII German Orientalism 
The German Orientalists claimed that the Kenites were coppersmiths and metalworkers.

Kenite  is a rendition of Hebrew קֵינִי Qeyniy. According to Gesenius, the name is derived from the name Cain (קַיִן Qayin). According to A. H. Sayce, the name ‘Kenite’ or Qéní, is identical to an Aramaic word meaning a smith, which in its turn is a cognate of Hebrew Qayin, with the meaning ‘a lance’.

According to the Kenite hypothesis, Yahweh was historically a Midian deity, and the association of Moses' father-in-law with Midian reflects the historical adoption of the Midianite cult by the Hebrews. Moses apparently identified Jethro's concept of God, Yahweh, with the Israelites' God El Shaddai.

Historical Identity

The Kenites are a clan mentioned in the bible and referred to as having settled on the southern border of Judah. According to the bible, in the time of David, the Kenites then settled among the tribe of Judah.

In Jeremiah 35:7-8 the Rechabites are described as tent-dwellers with an absolute prohibition against practicing agriculture; however, other Kenites are described elsewhere as city-dwellers.

Hippolytus of Rome in his Chronicon (AD 234) appears to identify the Kinaidokolpitai of central Arabia with the biblical Kenites.

In the Bible

Age of the Patriarchs 
The Bible mentions the Kenites as living in or around Canaan as early as the time of Abraham.

During the Exodus 
Moses’ father-in-law, Jethro, was a Kenite and a resident in the land of Midian. At the Exodus, Jethro and his clan inhabited the vicinity of Mount Sinai and Horeb. 

In  Jethro is said to have been a "priest in the land of Midian" and a resident of Midian. This has led many scholars to believe that the terms "Kenite" and "Midianite"  are intended (at least in parts of the Bible) to be used interchangeably, or that the Kenites formed a part of the Midianite tribal grouping. 

The Kenites journeyed with the Israelites to Canaan; and their encampment, apart from the latter's, was noticed by Balaam.

The Kenites were closely allied with Moses, and are not mentioned to have participated in the first invasion of Canaan that was conducted against Moses' orders.

During the second invasion of Canaan, the Kenites would have seen the area around the town of Arad, the region of Canaan that the next generation of Kenites would later chose as their place to settle after the conquest.

When the Israelites and Kenites were camped at the foot of Mount Peor, King Balak of Moab allied himself with the five Kings of Midian, but seeing that they did not have the strength to defeat the Israelites, the leaders of Moab and Midian gathered together and paid a large fee to Balaam to put a curse on the Israelite camp from the religious shrine on Mount Peor ((). Balaam was unable to curse Israel, but prophesied about the Kenites, saying that they would endure, but foretold that someday they would be lead away captive as slaves to Assur, ((), with the question of how long their future slavery would last being unanswered.

War between Israel and Midian 
While the camp was still encamped on the west side of Mount Peor, the local Moabites attempted to include the Israelites in their worship of their god Baal of Peor. During the commotion and bloodshed, Moses' grandnephew Phinehas killed a Midianite princess, Cozbi, the daughter of King Zur, one of the five Kings of Midian. Following this, Moses sent a strikeforce of 12,000 men (1000 from each Israelite tribe, the Kenites were not included) that succeed in killing the five kings Evi (אֱוִי),Rekem (רֶקֶם), Hur (חוּר), Reba (רֶבַע), and Zur (צַוָּר) the father of Cozbi, and burned each of the Midianite cities and all of their encampments, taking their livestock. The Kenites were not included in the invasion of Midian, it is unclear how the Kenites reacted to the fall of the Midianite kings that they had formerly been subject to.

During the Conquest of Canaan 

After the death of Moses, Joshua lead the Israelite invasion of Canaan; conquering a large portion of central Canaan. After Judah's sieges of Jerusalem and Debir,   says that Jethro's Kenite descendants "went up from the City of Palms, (which appears to be Zoar or Tamar in the upper Arabah), with the men of Judah to live among the people of the Desert of Judah in the Negev near Arad."

After settling in Canaan 
Following the conquest, the Israelites began to assimilate into the larger Canaanite culture and started converting to the Canaanite  religion, only returning to their national religion when confronted by an 8 year invasion and occupation by the North Mesopotamians (from Aram-Naharaim) under King Cushan-Rishathaim. The Israelites rose up under the leadership of Othniel the son of Kenaz, (thus the nephew of Caleb, Judah's previous war-leader) who was a neighbor of the Kenites and lived in the same area. Although the text is brief, it is likely Othniel had reliable political support at-the-ready from his relatives the Calebites and Kenizzites, and probably from his Kenite neighbors as well, this likely gave him a large support base for the tribe of Judah to unite around.

 
Later, King Eglon of Moab allied with the Kingdom of Ammon and nation of Amalek, in order to invade the territory of Israel. After defeating the Israelites, Moab and Amalek took the City of Palms (believed to be the later city of Zoar or Tamar), from the Kenites.

During the rise and fall of Hazor 

At this point, around 180 or 190 years after Joshua's invasion, the Canaanites in northern Canaan under King Jabin ruling from Hazor re-asserted their dominance over Canaan. The Israelite leader Shamgar appears to have been battling with the Philistines in south Canaan at the time, and was either caught off-guard, or unable to prevent the rising Canaanite military, economic, and political power. (Non-biblical sources depict the King of Hazor affirming loyalty to the Egyptian pharaoh, and joining the cities of Qatna and Mari to create a trade route that linked Egypt to Ekallatum)

During this period, Heber the Kenite and his wife Jael separated from their Kenite brethren in the south, and went to live in northern Canaan.

After two decades of North Canaanite dominance in the region, the prophetess Deborah, who was now leading Israel, commissioned Barak the son of Abinoam as her commander to lead the Israelites against the Canaanites. King Jabin's general Sisera learned that Barak was massing troops on Mount Tabor, situated between Sisera's base at Harosheth Haggoyim (believed to now be Ahwat) and the Canaanite capital at Hazor, and set out northward to meet him with 900 chariots. The weather became unfavorable to Sisera's army, the sky became clouded, and the river that his chariots needed to cross was flooded. While Sisera attempted to ford his chariots through the torrential Kishon River at a river crossing close to the then-Canaanite city of Taanach (Now known as Ti'inik) near Megiddo, Barak's 10,000 men went down southwestward from Mount Tabor to give battle on the plain and rivers. Sisera left his chariot behind and escaped the battle on foot, while Barak pursued the chariots that were fleeing back to the Canaanite base at Harosheth Haggoyim 

As Sisera fled on foot near Kedesh-Naphtali, he was passing by the tent of Heber the Kenite, and Jael offered to shelter him. Accepting her offer, he asked her to stand in the doorway of the tent, and to deny his presence to anyone who was chasing him. However, once he was asleep, Jael hammered a tent peg into Sisera's head, and he died.

From that point onwards, Israel grew stronger and continued to press Hazor harder, until King Jabin's defeat.

In the early Israelite Monarchy 
In the time of King Saul there were Kenites living in Amalek territory. The kindness which they had shown to Israel in the wilderness was gratefully remembered. "Ye showed kindness to all the children of Israel, when they came up out of Egypt," said Saul to them; and so not only were they spared by him, but David allowed them to share in the spoil that he took from the Amalekites.

Other well-known Kenites were Heber, the husband of Jael, and Rechab, the ancestor of the Rechabites.

Archeology

The Kenites have been proposed as a reason for the appearance of Midianite pottery imported into the Negev of the Kenites during the 1200s and 1100s BC. Petrographic studies carried out on some of the Timna wares led to the conclusion that they originated in the Hejaz, most probably in the site of Qurayya in Saudi Arabia.

J. Gunneweg analyzed potery samples with the help of The Hebrew University and the University of Bonn in 1991. The Midianite pottery found in the Negev was linked to a kiln discovered at Qurayya, Saudi Arabia, through Neutron Activation Analysis.

German Orientalist Scholarship

Kenites as descendants of Cain in German Orientalism 

According to some scholars, they are descendants of Cain. The German orientalist Wilhelm Gesenius asserted that the name is kabbalistically (mystically) derived from the name Cain (קַיִן Qayin). Their eponymous ancestor may have been Cain (Kain), to whose descendants the Jahwist (Jahwist is an invented name for a non-Moses author of Genesis) in Genesis chapter 4 attributes the invention of the art of working bronze and iron, the use of instruments of music, etc.

According to some scholars, the Kenites are also associated with coppersmithery and metalwork. Kenite is a rendition of Hebrew קֵינִי Qeni, and, according to A. H. Sayce, Kenite or Qéní is identical to a word in the language of Israel's enemy the Aramites,  meaning smith, that is in turn almost a cognate of a Hebrew word Qayin, meaning ‘a lance’. 

According to the critical interpretation of the Biblical data, the Kenites were a clan settled on the southern border of Judah, originally more advanced in arts than the Hebrews, and from whom the latter learned much. They supposedly migrated from southern Asia.

Sayce has implied that the Kenites were a tribe of smiths—a view to which Jahwist's statements   would lend support.

F.W. Ghillany's Kenite Hypothesis in German Orientalism 

According to the Kenite hypothesis in German Orientalism, Yahweh was historically a Midianite deity, and the association of Moses' father-in-law with Midian reflects the historical adoption of the Midianite cult by the Hebrews. Moses apparently identified Jethro's concept of God, Yahweh, with the Israelites' God El Shaddai.

The Kenite hypothesis supposes that the Hebrews adopted the cult of Yahweh from the Midianites via the Kenites. This view, first proposed by Friedrich Wilhelm Ghillany in 1862, afterward independently by Cornelis Petrus Tiele in 1872, and more fully by Bernhard Stade, has been more completely worked out by Karl Budde; it is accepted by H. Guthe, Gerrit Wildeboer, H. P. Smith, and G. A. Barton. Another theory is that a confederation of regional tribes were connected to monotheistic ritual at Sinai.

Kenites in the German Orientalist view of Mythology 
The German orientalist Walter Beltz believed that the story of Cain and Abel was not originally about the murder of a brother, but a myth about the murder of a god's child. In his reading of Genesis 4:1, Eve conceived Cain by Adam, and her second son Abel by another man, this being Yahweh. Eve is thus compared to the Sacred Queen of antiquity, the Mother goddess. Consequently, Yahweh pays heed to Abel's offerings, but not to Cain's. After Cain kills Abel, Yahweh condemns Cain, the murderer of his son, to the cruelest punishment imaginable among humans: banishment.

Beltz believed this to be the foundational myth of the Kenites, a clan settled on the southern border of Judah that eventually resettled among the tribes of Judah. It seemed clear to him that the purpose of this myth was to explain the difference between the nomadic and sedentary populations of Judah, with those living from their livestock (pastoralists, not raising crops) under the special protection of Yahweh.

Misconceptions

In modern sources the Kenites are often depicted as technologically-advanced nomadic blacksmiths who spread their culture and religion to Canaan. The suggestion that the Kenites were wandering smiths   was  first  made  by B. D. Stade in Beiträge  zur  Pentateuchkritik: dasKainszeichen in 1894 and  has  since  become  widespread. 

This far-fetched view of the Kenites originated in Germany the mid-1800s and is not reflected in any ancient Hebrew, Greek, Latin, or Arabic sources. In reality, the Kenites were simply semi-nomadic like most of their neighbors (Edom, Judah, Midian, Ammon), with no particular dislike of cities, and no particular connection to smithing. It has also been noted that mining, smelting, and forging do not go hand-in-hand with nomadism.

See also
 The Kinaidokolpitai, identified as being the Kenites in the 100s and 200s AD.
 The Midianites, Possible super-group to the Kenites 
 The Kenizzites, An ally of the Kenites in southern Canaan.
 The Calebites, a clan with mixed Judah and Kenizzite heritage, on friendly terms with the Kenites.
 The Ghassanids, the tribe to the south of the Kenites and the later Kinaidokolpitaites.
 Judah, a large Israelite tribe allied with the Kenites in southern Canaan, later the Kingdom of Judah.
 The Simeonites, an Israelite tribe allied with Judah, the Kenites lived in tents to their south and to their east.

References

Further reading
 Hirsch, Emil G., Bernhard Pick and George A. Barton. "Kenites." Jewish Encyclopedia. Funk and Wagnalls, 1901–1906; which cites to the following bibliography:
Stade, Geschichte des Volkes Israel, i. 126 et seq., Berlin, 1889;
Moore, "Judges", in International Critical Commentary, pp. 51–55, New York, 1895;
Budde, Religion of Israel to the Exile, pp. 17–38, New York;
Barton, Semitic Origins, pp. 271–278, ib. 1902.

External links
"Kenite". Encyclopædia Britannica Online. 2009.

 
Midian